Henry Potter may refer to:

 Henry Potter (judge) (1766–1857), longest-serving United States district court judge
 Henry C. Potter (1835–1908), bishop of the Episcopal Church of the United States
 H. C. Potter (1904–1977), American producer/director
 Henry Potter (golfer) (1881–1955), American golfer
 Henry F. Potter, aka "Mr. Potter", a fictional character in It's a Wonderful Life
 Henry Steven Potter, Acting Governor of Kenya in 1952, during the early stages of the Mau Mau Uprising
 Henry Potter & Co. Ltd, manufacturer of timpani, custom-built drums, and various other instruments

See also
Harry Potter (disambiguation)